The Laois Panthers are a rugby league team from Laois, Ireland. They play their home games at Togher Park, Portlaoise. The side play in the Irish Elite League, Ireland's top-tier rugby league competition.

See also
 Rugby League Ireland

Rugby union clubs in County Laois
Irish rugby league teams